Alpha Sigma Mu is a scholastic honor society recognizing academic achievement among students in the fields of Metallurgy and Materials Engineering.

The society was founded at Michigan Technological University in January, 1932.  After expanding to three campuses, it maintained these three chapters without further growth until the society was reorganized in 1957 with the assistance of the American Society for Metals. By 1963 the Society had grown enough to continue on its own.  It later expanded internationally, with recent chapters installed in India and Russia.

Alpha Sigma Mu was admitted to the Association of College Honor Societies in 1965.  

Alpha Sigma Mu honor society has 34 active chapters across the United States, and a total membership of over 8000.

See also

 Association of College Honor Societies

References

External links
 
 Alpha Sigma Mu at Association of College Honor Societies

Association of College Honor Societies
Honor societies
Student organizations established in 1932
1932 establishments in Michigan